Kirkthorpe is a village within the City of Wakefield metropolitan borough of West Yorkshire, England.

Toponymy

The name "Kirkthorpe" means "outlying or secondary hamlet or farmstead with a church". It is formed of two elements, the first being the Old Scandinavian word kirkja ("church") and the second being either the Old English throp or the Old Scandinavian thorp. Both of these potential second elements mean "outlying, dependent or secondary farmstead or hamlet".

History

The village's population is less than 100, so details are included in the parish of Warmfield cum Heath. The village has an Anglican church, the Church of St Peter, which was built in the 14th century and rebuilt in 1875. It is now a grade II* listed structure.

Kirkthorpe is one of the villages on the proposed route north to Leeds of HS2.

See also
Listed buildings in Warmfield cum Heath

References

External links

Villages in West Yorkshire
Geography of the City of Wakefield